Kivuusama Mays (born January 7, 1975) is a former linebacker in the National Football League.

Biography
Mays was born on January 7, 1975, in Anniston, Alabama.

Career
Kivuusama was drafted in the fourth round of the 1998 NFL Draft by the Minnesota Vikings and played that season with the team. He split the following season between the Vikings and the Green Bay Packers.

He played at the collegiate level at the University of North Carolina at Chapel Hill.

See also
List of Green Bay Packers players

References

External links
Just Sports Stats

Sportspeople from Anniston, Alabama
Minnesota Vikings players
Green Bay Packers players
Chicago Enforcers players
American football linebackers
University of North Carolina at Chapel Hill alumni
North Carolina Tar Heels football players
Living people
1975 births